The 4th Gran Premio di Modena was a Formula Two motor race held on 20 September 1953 at the Autodromo di Modena, Italy. The race was run over 100 laps of the circuit, and was won by Argentinian driver Juan Manuel Fangio in a Maserati A6GCM. Fangio also qualified on pole and set fastest lap. His teammates Onofre Marimón and Emmanuel de Graffenried finished second and third.

The race meeting was marred by the death of Charles de Tornaco who rolled his Ferrari 500 during pre-race practice.

Classification

References

Modena Grand Prix
Modena Grand Prix
Modena Grand Prix